

The Piel CP.500 was a light aircraft of unusual configuration designed in France in the 1970s with the intention of marketing it for homebuilding. This did not transpire, however, and no prototype was actually built. It was a tandem wing design, somewhat reminiscent of the Mignet Pou-du-Ciel but considerably larger. Also, unlike the Pou-du-Ciel's unusual control system, the CP.500's pitch and roll control was to come from more conventional elevons mounted on the rear wing. The rear wing was also to carry endplate-style fins and rudders. Twin engines were to be mounted in push-pull fashion at the nose and tail ends of the fuselage, with the aircraft capable of single-engine operation in case of emergency. Two seats were to be provided at the front of the fully enclosed cabin, with a bench seat for three passengers behind them, plus an optional seat for a sixth occupant behind this. The undercarriage was to be of fixed, tricycle configuration. Construction was originally planned to be of wood, with engine cowlings and wingtips of composite construction. However, as development progressed, Piel considered metal as the main construction material.

Specifications (as designed)

Notes

References
 
 
 
 

1970s French civil utility aircraft
Piel aircraft
Homebuilt aircraft
Tandem-wing aircraft